Dictionary is an Indian Bengali-language drama film directed by Bratya Basu and produced by Firdausul Hasan and Prabal Halder. 
The music is composed by Prabuddha Banerjee. The storyline of the film is based on the story, Baba Hoya and Swami Hoya, by Buddhadeb Guha The film was theatrically released on 12 February 2021.

Plot
Makar Kanti Chatterjee (Mosharraf) is a semi-educated self-made businessman who tries hard but often fails to communicate in English. On the other hand, his brother-in-law Suman (Arna) gets romantically involved with a woman (Nusrat) married to an introverted forest officer, Ashoke Sanyal (Abir). These two interconnected yet distinct stories form the crux of the film.

Cast 
 Abir Chatterjee as Ashoke Sanyal
 Nusrat Jahan as Smita Sanyal
 Mosharraf Karim as Makar Kranti Chatterjee
 Arna Mukherjee as Suman
 Madhurima Basak as Nabanita
 Sagnik Chowdhury as Rakesh
 Poulomi Basu as Sreemati Chatterjee

Release
The film was released by SSR Cinemas Pvt. Ltd. on 12 February 2021.

Award
Gautam Buddha Award for Best Feature Film in the Nepal International Film Festival.

References 

2021 films
Bengali-language Indian films
Indian romantic drama films
2021 romantic drama films
2020s Bengali-language films
Films directed by Bratya Basu